United States v. Woods, 571 U.S. 31 (2013), was a United States Supreme Court case in which the Court addressed whether district courts have jurisdiction regarding provisions of the Internal Revenue Service Code and its implementation. The court held unanimously that a district court has jurisdiction in the application of the Internal Revenues Service Code to a partnership-level proceeding when it is applied to that partnership. The court additionally found that a transaction determined to lack economic substance can still trigger the penalty for overstatement because the overstatement and the action that led to it are inherently tied together.

References

External links
 

2013 in United States case law
United States Supreme Court cases
United States Supreme Court cases of the Roberts Court